Romia is an unincorporated community in Bryan County, Oklahoma, United States. It had a post office from August 30, 1915 until June 30, 1934. Romia was named after Romia Lewis, the daughter of the first postmaster, Ollie E. Lewis.

References

Unincorporated communities in Bryan County, Oklahoma
Unincorporated communities in Oklahoma